Peter Urbanus Sartoris (alias Pierre-Urbain Sartoris in French or Urbain Sartoris) was a Swiss banker, born around 1767 in Geneva, who died in Paris November 30, 1833. He had offices in London and Sceaux, Hauts-de-Seine as well.

Biography 
The son of a Huguenot banker, Jean-Jacques Sartoris, and Anne Greffuhle (aunt of Jean-Henry-Louis Greffulhe), he used to live in Gloucester Place close to Regent's Park, and married 1813 Hester Matilda Tunno, daughter of the Scottish banker John Tunno (1746-1819) and sister of Edward Rose Tunno. They had six children including a son, the British statesman Edward John Sartoris, and a daughter who later married Louis Victor Arthur des Acres de l'Aigle.

Shortly after 1818, he acted as first consul of the Swiss Confederacy in the United Kingdom, then was succeeded by Alexandre Prévost Prévost wrote of him : 'He [Urbain Sartoris] had both good fortune and ambition, or rather self-pride. Thanks to his diplomatic charge, he thought he could fling open the gates of high society for himself; yet no sooner had he passed the line he had been craving for, did he stop caring for a second-order office, which he openly declared to me, offering me to be introduced as his successor'.

During the French Restoration, Sartoris invested millions of francs in inland waterways, lived by then in his manor at Sceaux. He bought the estates of la Garenne de Colombes, which his inheritors sold by pieces around 1865.

Family
Peter and Hester Sartoris had six children:
 Jean-Édouard, (1814 - 1888), also known as  Edward John Sartoris
 Henriette-Élisa, b. 13 August 1815
 Frédéric-Urbain, b. 21 January 1820, also known as Frederic Urban Sartoris, High Sheriff of Northamptonshire in 1855
 Charles-Urbain, b. 14 October 1825
 Alfred Urbain, b. 16 December 1826 - 1909
 Jules-Alexandre, b. 22 October 1831 - 1863 Dublin

References

Bankers from the Republic of Geneva
1833 deaths
19th-century Swiss businesspeople